Chirkovo is a rural locality (a village) in Vysokovskoye Rural Settlement, Ust-Kubinsky  District, Vologda Oblast, Russia. The population was 44 as of 2002. There are 2 streets.

Geography 
Chirkovo is located 14 km south of Ustye (the district's administrative centre) by road. Kochurovo is the nearest rural locality.

References 

Rural localities in Ust-Kubinsky District